The 27th European Inline Speed Skating Championships were held in Wörgl, Austria, from 20 July to 26 July 2015. Organized by European Confederation of Roller Skating.

Medallists

Medal table

Total Medal Table (Senior, Junior A and Junior B)

References

Roller skating competitions
2015 in roller sports
2015 in Austrian sport